Anji bai (pronounced ) or Anji white is a green tea originally produced in Anji County, Zhejiang Province, China. Now, it can also be found in Changxing County, Zhejiang Province, China.

This tea cultivar was discovered in 1982, is not as widely planted as other teas and has a short harvesting period; it is a comparatively rare tea, and as such, is among the most expensive teas in China.

It is called "white" tea although it is a green tea. The long, narrow leaves are yellow in colour and have a recognisable fold along the length of the leaf.

A 2010 study found that the tea is high in polysaccharides which can inhibit the hemolysis of blood cells.

See also

 List of Chinese teas

References

Green tea
Chinese teas